The Nandi Award for Best Costume Designer winners since 1985:

References

Costume Designer
Awards for film costume design